"Karma" is a song by American singer-songwriter Taylor Swift. It was released on October 21, 2022, as the eleventh track of her tenth studio album, Midnights (2022). An electroclash and chillwave song with elements of techno and new wave, "Karma" was written and produced by Swift, Jack Antonoff, Sounwave, Keanu Beats and Jahaan Sweet. The lyrics discuss Swift's culmination of "good karma" in her life as opposed to her detractors. Upon the album's release, "Karma" was named a highlight on the album by many critics. Commercially, it charted in various territories, reaching the top-10 in Australia, Canada and the United States. "Karma" was performed by Swift as the closing song on the Eras Tour (2023).

Background and release
 Taylor Swift's fifth studio album, 1989, was released in October 2014. It was met with widespread commercial and critical success, but Swift's public image suffered from increasing tabloid scrutiny. In early 2016, she was embroiled in a highly publicized dispute with American rapper Kanye West and his then-wife Kim Kardashian over a controversial lyric about her in his single "Famous", with the latter accusing Swift of lying. To a question in an April 2016 interview with Vogue, Swift replied "Karma is real." Subsequent developments in the controversy and persistent media coverage of Swift's private life tarnished her repute, and hence, she retired from social media and public appearances for a year, and did not release an album in 2016, detouring from her usual cycle of releasing an album every two years. In November 2017, Swift ended her hiatus and released her sixth studio album, Reputation, accompanied by its lead single "Look What You Made Me Do", which contained lyrics about karma. She released her seventh studio album, Lover, in August 2019, amidst another controversy—a dispute with her former record label, Big Machine Records, and its new owner Scooter Braun over the masters of her first six albums. Online speculation regarding a "lost Taylor Swift album" that was supposed to be released in 2016, titled Karma, was reignited following the music video for Lover final single, "The Man", in January 2020; the video featured numerous symbolisms and easter eggs, including a graffiti wall that featured titles of the six albums around the word "KARMA" in the middle. Fans and media outlets speculated that Karma would be released soon.

On August 28, 2022, Swift announced her tenth studio album, Midnights, set for release on October 21, 2022. The track-list was not immediately revealed. Jack Antonoff, a longtime collaborator of Swift who had worked with her since 1989, was confirmed as a producer on Midnights by a video posted to Swift's Instagram account on September 16, 2022. Beginning on September 21, 2022, Swift began unveiling the track-list in a randomized order through her short video series on TikTok, called Midnights Mayhem with Me. It consisted of 13 episodes, with one song revealed every episode. Swift rolls a lottery cage containing 13 ping pong balls numbered from one to thirteen, each representing a track of Midnights, and when a ball drops out, she disclosed the title of the corresponding track on the album. In the eighth episode on October 6, 2022, Swift announced the title of the eleventh track as "Karma". Several media outlets associated the track with the "unreleased" Karma album, with some surmising this as Swift's confirmation of the theory. The song alongside the thirteen announced tracks and additional surprise-released tracks for the 3 am edition of Midnights, was released on October 21, 2022, under Republic Records.

Composition
"Karma" is a playful, electroclash and chillwave "diss track" with elements of new wave, alternative pop and techno, and comical lyrics. It describes the culmination of Swift's "good karma".

Critical reception
Rolling Stone named it the 4th best song of 2022, calling it an "album-defining" hit for combining Swift's "mastermind" lyrics and the "sleekest, most flexible" production. John Wohlmacher of Beats Per Minute hailed "Karma" as an "immediate masterpiece", lauding the "bright and colorful" music. American Songwriter listed it as one of the 24 best songs of 2022, calling it the "sleeper hit" of Midnights; praise was directed towards Swift's lyrical approach, the "effervescent" chorus, and Antonoff's production.

Commercial performance
"Karma" debuted at number nine on the US Billboard Hot 100 upon the album's release. All of the album's 20 tracks debuted in the top-45 of the Hot 100, giving Swift a total of 188 Hot 100 entries. Swift became the first act to occupy the entire top 10 of the Hot 100 concurrently and the woman with the most top-10 entries (40), surpassing Madonna (38). The song remained on the chart for six weeks. In Canada, it peaked at number eight on the Canadian Hot 100 and was certified platinum by Music Canada on January 19, 2023. Elsewhere, "Karma" charted in eight countries, at number nine in Australia, number 11 in the Philippines, number 12 in Singapore and Slovakia, number 18, in Malaysia, number 25 in Vietnam, number 38 in Sweden, and number 66 in Spain. The song debuted and peaked at number 13 on the Billboard Global 200.

Credits and personnel
Credits are adapted from Pitchfork and the liner notes of Midnights.
Recording
 Recorded at Rough Customer Studio (Brooklyn), Electric Lady Studios (New York City), and Henson Recording Studio (Los Angeles)
 Mixed at MixStar Studios (Virginia Beach)
 Mastered at Sterling Sound (Edgewater, New Jersey)
 Sounwave's performance was recorded by himself at Sound of Waves Studios (Los Angeles)
 Jahaan Sweet's performance was recorded by himself at The Sweet Spot (Los Angeles)

Personnel
 Taylor Swift – vocals, songwriter, producer
 Jack Antonoff – songwriter, producer, engineer, drums, programming, percussion, synths, juno, omnichord, recording
 Sounwave – songwriter, producer, engineer, programming, recording
 Keanu Beats – producer, engineer, synths, recording
 Jahaan Sweet – songwriter, co-producer, engineer, keyboard, synth pad, recording
 Serban Ghenea – mix engineer
 Bryce Bordone – assistant mix engineer
 Randy Merrill – mastering engineer
 Megan Searl – assistant engineer
 John Sher – assistant engineer
 John Rooney – assistant engineer
 Mark Aguilar – assistant engineer
 Laura Sisk – engineer, recording

Charts

Certifications

References

2022 songs
Taylor Swift songs
Songs written by Taylor Swift
Songs written by Jack Antonoff
Songs written by Sounwave
Song recordings produced by Taylor Swift
Song recordings produced by Jack Antonoff
Electroclash songs